"Let's Ride" is the first single from Canadian rapper Choclair's debut album, Ice Cold. Produced by Kardinal Offishall, the song features ad-libs by Saukrates. The song is well known for its catchy piano hook and chorus. Commercially, "Let's Ride" reached number 38 in Canada and number 37 on the US Billboard Hot Rap Songs chart.

Music video
Directed by Little X, most of the music video was shot in Downtown Toronto. It begins with Choclair driving a Mercedes-Benz convertible, with a female passenger. In the next scene, he is a passenger on a motorcycle. In the third scene he drives a Hummer, with Kardinal Offishall as his passenger. In the final scene, Choclair rides on a bicycle alongside Saukrates.

Track listing
12" single

A-side
"Let's Ride" (Radio Edit)
"Let's Ride" (Main Mix)
"Let's Ride" (Instrumental)

B-side
"Bare Witness" (Radio Edit) (featuring Guru)
"Bare Witness" (Main Mix) (featuring Guru)
"Bare Witness" (Instrumental)

Charts

Other appearances
The instrumental is heard at the beginning and ending of Kardinal Offishall's 1997 music video for "On wit da Show".
The song is featured on the soundtracks of 3 Strikes and NBA Live 2001.

References

1999 singles
1999 songs
Choclair songs
Music videos directed by Director X
Priority Records singles
Songs written by Kardinal Offishall
Virgin Records singles